The Illinois Valley Pistol Shrimp are a collegiate summer league baseball team in the Prospect League. They play at Veterans Memorial Park in Peru, Illinois, United States. The Pistol Shrimp formed in Lisle, Illinois in late 2018 as an expansion franchise for the 2019 season, under the name DuPage Pistol Shrimp. They and other collegiate summer leagues and teams exist to give top college players professional-like experience without affecting NCAA eligibility.

DuPage County's previous team in the Prospect League, the DuPage Drones, suspended operations after the 2017 season, leaving the city without a team for the 2018 season. After a division championship appearance in 2019 and a cancelled season in 2020 due to the COVID-19 pandemic, the Pistol Shrimp relocated to Peru, Illinois for the 2021 season, citing possible attendance limitations in DuPage County related to the pandemic. Shortly after the conclusion of the 2021 season, the Pistol Shrimp confirmed they'd return to the Illinois Valley for the 2022 season.

The Pistol Shrimp play in the Prospect League's Eastern Conference - Wabash River Division along with the Danville Dans, Lafayette Aviators, and Terre Haute Rex.

Seasons

Roster

References

External links
Official website

Amateur baseball teams in Illinois
Prospect League teams
Baseball teams established in 2018
2018 establishments in Illinois